The Canton of Quiberon is an administrative division of the Morbihan department, northwestern France. Its borders were modified at the 2014 French canton reorganisation which came into effect in March 2015. Its seat is in Quiberon.

Composition

Composition before 2015 
Prior to 2015 the Canton of Quiberon grouped together 7 distinct communes.

Composition since 2015 
The Canton of Quiberon currently consists of 16 communes in their entirety.

References

Cantons of Morbihan